Nazih Al-Ayubi (1944 in Cairo – 1995), is an Egyptian writer who had obtained a BSc (1964) and MSc (1968) in Political Science from Cairo University, PhD in political science from the University of Oxford in England. He taught at the University of California, Los Angeles, and the University of Exeter in England. Ayoubi's areas of interest included political economy, Egyptian politics, international relations, and the international politics of Islamic countries. Al-Ayoubi played an important role in the development of the field of Middle Eastern studies in the universities in which he taught, and his classic work "Amplifying the Arab State" became an indispensable reference for political studies in the region.

References 

Egyptian male writers
1944 births
1995 deaths
Cairo University alumni
Alumni of the University of Oxford
University of California, Los Angeles faculty
Academics of the University of Exeter